Most of Sriwijaya Air destinations are domestic. It has multiple routes.

Domestic

 Indonesia
Java and Lesser Sunda Islands
Bali (Ngurah Rai International Airport)
Bandung (Husein Sastranegara International Airport)
Jakarta (Soekarno-Hatta International Airport)
Kupang (El Tari Airport)
Malang (Abdul Rachman Saleh Airport)
Semarang (Achmad Yani International Airport)
Surakarta (Adisumarmo International Airport)
Surabaya (Juanda International Airport)
Yogyakarta (Adisucipto International Airport)
Sumatra and Riau Islands
Bandar Lampung (Radin Inten II Airport)
Batam (Hang Nadim Airport)
Bengkulu (Fatmawati Soekarno Airport)
Jambi (Sultan Thaha Airport)
Medan (Kualanamu International Airport)
Padang (Minangkabau International Airport)
Palembang (Sultan Mahmud Badaruddin II Airport)
Pangkal Pinang (Pangkal Pinang Airport)
Tanjung Pandan (Buluh Tumbang Airport)
Kalimantan
Banjarmasin (Syamsudin Noor Airport)
Pontianak (Supadio Airport)
Tarakan (Juwata Airport)
Sulawesi and Maluku
Ambon (Pattimura Airport)
Gorontalo (Jalaluddin Airport)
Kendari (Wolter Monginsidi Airport)
Makassar (Sultan Hasanuddin International Airport)
Manado (Sam Ratulangi Airport)
Palu (Mutiara SIS Al-Jufrie Airport)
West Papua and Irian Jaya
Sorong (Sorong Airport)
Manokwari (Rendani Airport)

International

 China
Changsha (Changsha Huanghua International Airport)
Haikou (Haikou Meilan International Airport)
Hangzhou (Hangzhou Xiaoshan International Airport)
Nanjing (Nanjing Lukou International Airport)
Wuhan (Wuhan Tianhe International Airport)
 Malaysia
Penang (Penang International Airport)

Terminated Destinations

Indonesia
Balikpapan (Sultan Aji Muhammad Sulaiman Airport)
Banda Aceh (Sultan Iskandarmuda Airport)
Palangkaraya (Tjilik Riwut Airport)
Pekanbaru (Sultan Syarif Kasim II International Airport)
Philippines
Davao (Francisco Bangoy International Airport)
Singapore
 Singapore Changi Airport

References

Lists of airline destinations